Man of God is a biblical title of respect applied to prophets and beloved religious leaders. The term appears 78 times in 72 verses of the Bible, in application to up to 13 individuals:

Moses (Deuteronomy ; Joshua ; Psalm 90:1; Ezra 3:2; 1 Chronicles 23:14; 2 Chronicles 30:16). Moses is the only person called “man of God” in the Torah.
The angel of the Lord who appeared to Samson's mother (Judges 13:6, 8) whom she may have taken to be a prophet (Leviticus Rabbah 1:1)
The man who chastised the Priest Eli (1 Samuel 2:27) whom Sifre identifies as Samuel's father Elkanah (Sifre to Deuteronomy 342:4)
Samuel (1 Samuel 9:6, 7, 8, 10)
David (Nehemiah 12:24, 36; 2 Chronicles 8:14)
Shemaiah (1 Kings 12:22; 2 Chronicles 11:2)
The man from Judah who cried out against King Jeroboam of Israel (1 Kings 13:1 (twice), 4, 5, 6 (twice), 7, 8, 11, 12, 14 (twice), 21, 26, 29, 31), whose tomb King Josiah protected and preserved when he destroyed the idolatrous tombs in Bethel (2 Kings 23:16, 17) and whom some rabbis identify as Iddo (Sifre to Deuteronomy 342:4; Pesikta de-Rav Kahana 2:85; Zohar 2:64a)
Elijah (1 Kings 17:18, 24; 2 Kings 1:9, 10, 11, 12, 13)
The man who told King Ahab of Israel that Israel could defeat the Arameans (1 Kings 20:28) whom Sifre identifies as Micah (Sifre to Deut. 342:4), but who from context might also be Elijah
Elisha (2 Kings 4:7, 9, 16, 21, 22, 25, 27 (twice), 40, 42; 5:8, 14, 15, 20; 6:6, 9, 10, 15; 7:2, 17, 18, 19; 8:2, 4, 7, 8, 11, 19)
Hanan son of Igdaliah (Jeremiah 35:4)
The man who warned King Amaziah of Judah not to go to war (2 Chronicles 25:7, 9 (twice)), whom some rabbis identify as Amoz (Sifre to Deut. 342:4; Seder Olam Rabbah 20)
Timothy (1 Timothy 6:11, 2 Timothy 3:17)

Hebrew and Greek words 
At Deuteronomy 33:1, for example, the Hebrew and Greek words for "man of god" are:
Hebrew: אִ֥ישׁ -- "man"; הָאֱלֹהִ֖ים "of god" (full text)
Greek (Septuagint): ἄνθρωπος -- "man"; τοῦ θεοῦ -- "of god" (full text)

Hebrew Bible words and phrases
New Testament words and phrases